Kisapmata (English: In the Wink of an Eye) is a 1981 Filipino psychological horror film directed by Mike de Leon, with a screenplay by de Leon, Clodualdo del Mundo Jr., and Raquel Villavicencio. It stars Vic Silayan, Charo Santos, Jay Ilagan, and Charito Solis.

The plot was inspired by the crime reportage "The House on Zapote Street" written by Nick Joaquin under the pen name Quijano de Manila. The article was first published in the January 1961 issue of Philippines Free Press magazine, and was later republished in Joaquin's 1977 non-fiction anthology Reportage on Crime: Thirteen Horror Happenings that Hit the Headlines. Written in the New Journalism style, the piece chronicles the events leading up to the highly publicized familicide committed by Pablo Cabading, a retired policeman.

Premiering at the 7th Metro Manila Film Festival, the film received critical acclaim, establishing de Leon as one of the great directors of the new generation of Filipino filmmakers. It won ten of the festival awards, including Best Film, and was screened at the 1982 Cannes Film Festival during the Directors' Fortnight, alongside de Leon's Batch '81. The film was adjudged by the Manunuri ng Pelikulang Pilipino as one of the Ten Best Films of the Decade. In 2020, the film was digitally restored with a subsequent theatrical screening at the 34th Il Cinema Ritrovato in Bologna, Italy.

Controversial upon release, it was the first major treatment of incest in Philippine cinema and has been viewed as a commentary against the patriarchy and the regime of then President Ferdinand Marcos.

Plot 
The film opens with Mila Carandang (Charo Santos) reluctantly telling her domineering father Diosdado "Dadong" (Vic Silayan), a retired policeman, that she is pregnant. Mila asks permission from her father to marry her co-worker Noel Manalansan (Jay Ilagan). Dadong begrudgingly gives his permission when his unreasonable demands for a hefty dowry are met.

After the wedding, Dadong insists that the newlyweds stay in his house. Despite protestations, the young couple acquiesce. During their time living in the Carandang house, Mila tells Noel that she must stay with her sick mother Adelina "Dely" (Charito Solis), much to Noel's annoyance as he wants to move out with Mila as soon as possible. One evening, Noel is forced to find other accommodations after he is locked out of the house.

Although still fearful of her father, Mila decides to escape. She and Noel stay with Noel's father (Ruben Rustia). The young couple, however, return to the Carandang house to gather their belongings. Dadong pleads with Mila to stay, saying he has an interest in the baby she is carrying (suggesting that he has been carrying an incestuous relationship with his daughter). As Mila and Noel stand firm on leaving, Dadong is driven to desperation, pulls out his gun, and shoots Dely, Noel, Mila, and finally himself.

Cast

Production

Development 
Director Mike de Leon was interested in adapting Nick Joaquin's article as early as 1978 but experienced difficulty in finding a producer who was willing to back a film with such dark themes. It was eventually produced by Bancom Audiovision, a subsidiary of Union Bank, which had previously produced Lina Brocka's Jaguar, also based on a Joaquin article, and Eddie Romero's Aguila, on which de Leon was cinematographer. Kisapmata would be Bancom Audiovision's final production.

The screenplay was written by de Leon, Clodualdo del Mundo, Jr., and Raquel Villavicencio, the same team who previously collaborated on de Leon's 1980 film Kakabakaba Ka Ba? and de Leon's then on production hiatus Batch '81.

In order to avoid lawsuits, the names of the people in Joaquin's report were changed from the Cabading family to the Carandang family, as well as the profession of the young couple from doctors to accountants. Beyond the Joaquin article, De Leon also did additional research on the crime, uncovering details that were never released to the public including the fact that the father hid under the young couple's bed while they were sleeping, and that the father had two wives, although these were not included in the film. Vic Silayan, who plays Dadong Carandang, had asked de Leon if the character could be changed to a step-father as he was uncomfortable with the incest issue, but they both acknowledged it would ultimately change the film.

Filming 
The film was completed in three months, which de Leon attributed to the fact that they had "no egos to massage" when it came to the actors. It was made while production on de Leon's Batch '81 was on hiatus due to budget problems.

The house used as the Carandang house in the film was located in Santa Mesa Heights, Quezon City and had the design of the prevailing domestic architectural style: a split-level suburban home. It was considered the first and biggest production requirement of the film, providing a crucial function to establish the setting and mood. Production designer Cesar Hernando had come across the house while on lookout for a location to film the riot scene for Batch '81. Hernando and his team had to fill the house with furniture, including adding the barbed wires on the gate and the taxidermy deer in the living room, both of which would serve as a visual metaphor in the film. The set was completed in three weeks, with shooting lasting a mere 18 days.

Themes 
Kisapmata is generally viewed as an allegory of the dictatorial regime of then President Ferdinand Marcos, a theme director Mike de Leon explored further in his following films Batch '81, which also served as a nation-allegory, and Sister Stella L, which offered a more overt approach. Academics such as Nicanor Tiongson found the violent and unreasonable relationship of Dadong Carandang, the over-possessive father, with Mila, his incest victim, as a microcosm of Marcos' rule. Released one year before Martial Law was lifted, during a time of growing political upheaval, the desperation and breakdown of the father as his daughter slips away subtly points towards the fragile condition of the Philippine nation.

Release 
On December 24, 1981, a day before the opening of the 7th Metro Manila Film Festival, a temporary restraining order was filed by Asuncion Cabading to stop the screening of Kisapmata. Cabading was the widow of the deceased police detective written about in "The House on Zapote Street." Director Mike de Leon admitted that the production team had forgotten that she survived the massacre. The issue was quickly resolved and the film was able to premier on schedule the following day. It was later screened at the 1982 Cannes Film Festival during the Directors' Fortnight, alongside de Leon's 1982 film Batch '81.

Censorship 
Due to its controversial theme, only subtle references to incest are used throughout the film. Nevertheless, Kisapmata was subjected to the Board of Censors for Motion Pictures, then headed by Senator Maria Kalaw Katigbak, who required de Leon to remove a scene where Dadong Carandang enters his daughter's room as she fearfully waits for him come in. Academic Nicanor Tiongson found that as a result "the point of the scene – the horror of incest – was obscured." The scene was re-added for the screening at the Cannes Film Festival.

De Leon has referred to the Metro Manila Film Festival copy as the "theatrical version" and the Cannes Film Festival copy as the "final cut."

Restoration 
The digital restoration of the film was originally funded by de Leon and used an original print the director had kept at the Asian Film Archive in Singapore. This print used was of the "final cut" that screened at the Cannes Film Festival, not the edited and censored version shown at the Metro Manila Film Festival. The restoration itself was done by L’Immagine Ritrovata, the same film lab De Leon worked with for the restoration of his 1982 film Batch '81, as well as Lina Brocka's 1975 film Maynila, sa mga Kuko ng Liwanag, on which de Leon was cinematographer and co-producer. While Kisapmata was in the process of being restored, Union Bank, the parent company of the defunct production company Bancom Audiovision, reimbursed de Leon half of the restoration cost and offered co-ownership.

On August 31, 2020, the restored version premiered at the 34th Il Cinema Ritrovato, a festival dedicated to recovered and restored classics, in Bologna, Italy.

Reception 
Mel Tobias included the film in his collection One Hundred Acclaimed Tagalog Movies and wrote "this complex and remarkably modulated film may be de Leon's finest work." Noel Vera, writing for BusinessWorld, called Kisapmata "easily Mike de Leon's masterpiece" and "one of the greatest Filipino films". Similarly, critic Oggs Cruz considered the film de Leon's "masterpiece" and went on to say "the characters in de Leon's films are real human beings – they work, they interact with other people, they have needs and ambitions. It is that factor that turns this nightmare even far more chilling that Hitchcock's masterpiece [Psycho]."

Accolades

See also 
 Jaguar (1979 film)
 Of the Flesh

References

Works cited

Further reading

External links
 

1981 films
Philippine horror films
1980s Tagalog-language films
1981 drama films
Incest in film
Films directed by Mike De Leon